Sakow District is a district in the southern Middle Juba (Jubbada Dhexe) of Somalia. Its capital lies at Saakow.

References

External links
 Districts of Somalia
 Administrative map of Sakow District

Districts of Somalia

Middle Juba